Georges Chelon (born 4 January 1943) is a French singer and songwriter. He was made a member of the Ordre des Arts et des Lettres in 1985.

Discography
 1965 Père prodigue
 1965 15-20 et plus...
 1966 La bourse des chansons N°15
 1967 Bobino 67
 1967 La bourse des chansons N°16, N°17, N°18
 1968 15-20 et plus...
 1968 Tu sais
 1968 Sampa
 1969 Chelon 69
 1970 Vengeance
 1971 Olympia 71
 1972 Soirée avec
 1973 Ouvrez les portes de la vie
 1975 Si demain
 1975 Père prodigue
 1976 Faits divers
 1977 Commencer à revivre
 1977 Sampa, Parole, Evelyne
 1979 Tous les deux comme hier
 1982 Orange et citron
 1982 Père prodigue
 1983 Poète en l'an 2000
 1986 Père prodigue
 1987 Petit enfant de l'univers
 1989 Poète en l'an 2000
 1989 L'enfant du Liban
 1990 Chercheurs d'eau
 1990 Père prodigue
 1991 2000 c'est demain
 1991 Georges Chelon chante la Seine
 1991 Georges Chelon en public
 1994 L'air de rien
 1995 Le cosmonaute
 1997 Ballades en solitaire
 1997 Ma compilation
 1997 Ouvrez les portes de la vie
 1998 On rêve, on rêve
 1998 Morte saison
 1999 Père prodigue
 2000 Les portes de l'enfer
 2000 L'enfant du Liban / Chercheurs d'eau
 2000 Petit enfant de l'univers / Le grand dadais
 2000 2000 c'est demain / L'air de rien
 2000 Georges Chelon
 2001 Père prodigue
 2001 Morte saison
 2002 Lettres ouvertes
 2003 La Salopette
 2003 Georges Chelon chante la Seine
 2003 Chansons à part...
 2004 Suppose que...
 2004 Georges Chelon chante Les Fleurs du Mal / Charles Baudelaire / Volume 1
 2005 L'impasse
 2006 Georges Chelon chante Les Fleurs du Mal / Charles Baudelaire / Volume 2
 2008 Olympia 2008 (Parution en double CD et en DVD)
 2008 Georges Chelon chante Les Fleurs du Mal / Charles Baudelaire / Volume 3
 2009 Georges Chelon chante Les Fleurs du Mal / Charles Baudelaire / Complete 7 CD
 2010 Mes préférences
 2011 C'est passé vite

References
"Georges Chelon: une chanson, un message" from L'Evangéline
"Georges Chelon" from Le Français dans le monde

1943 births
Living people
French male singers
Knights of the Ordre national du Mérite